MP-2001, also known as 2,3,4-trimethoxyestra-1,3,5(10)-trien-17β-ol or 2,4-dimethoxyestradiol 3-methyl ether, is a steroid and derivative of estradiol that was described in 1966 and is devoid of estrogenic activity but produces potent analgesic effects in animals. It was never marketed.

See also
 2-Methoxyestradiol
 4-Methoxyestradiol

References

Analgesics
Estranes
Ethers